Kirill Vais (born 27 August 1995) is a Kyrgyzstani swimmer. He competed in the men's 50 metre breaststroke event at the 2017 World Aquatics Championships. In 2019, he represented Kyrgyzstan at the 2019 World Aquatics Championships held in Gwangju, South Korea and he competed in the men's 50 metre breaststroke event. He did not advance to compete in the semi-finals.

References

External links
 

1995 births
Living people
Kyrgyzstani male breaststroke swimmers
Place of birth missing (living people)